Di Chirico is an Italian surname. Notable people with the surname include:

Alessio Di Chirico (born 1989), Italian mixed martial artist
Giacomo Di Chirico (1844 – 1883), Italian painter

See also
Chirico (disambiguation)

Italian-language surnames